Minds of Peace is a nonprofit organization in Israel and Palestine with the aim of promoting agreements between the leaders of the nations by advocating and arranging public congresses in which ordinary Israelis and Palestinians negotiate a peace deal.
The organization is led by Dr. Sapir Hendelman.
Past congresses were covered by Israeli Public Broadcasting Corporation and the BBC.

References

Israeli–Palestinian peace process